Windsor was an electoral district of the Legislative Assembly in the Australian state of Queensland from 1912 to 1992.

First created for the 1912 state election, the district was based in the northern suburbs of Brisbane, taking in areas north of Breakfast Creek and south of Kedron Brook. Later redistributions expanded the district westward, whilst still retaining the suburbs of Alderley, Grange, Wilston and Windsor.

Windsor was abolished ahead of 1992 state election, divided between the pre-existing district of Brisbane Central and the new district of Kedron.

Members for Windsor

Election results

See also
 Electoral districts of Queensland
 Members of the Queensland Legislative Assembly by year
 :Category:Members of the Queensland Legislative Assembly by name

References

Former electoral districts of Queensland